Roger Verschaeve (born 23 May 1951) is a Belgian racing cyclist. He rode in the 1974 Tour de France.

References

External links
 

1951 births
Living people
Belgian male cyclists
Place of birth missing (living people)